Calumet, Illinois may refer to the following place:
Calumet City, Illinois
Calumet Park, Illinois
Calumet Township, Cook County, Illinois
Calumet River